Margaret Gillespie Wyllie  (February 15, 1917 – January 1, 2002) was an American actress who appeared primarily on television. She is best known for he role as Mrs. Kissel in The Travels of Jaimie McPheeters (1963-1964).

Early years
Born in Honolulu, Territory of Hawaii, Wyllie grew up in the Philippines, where her father worked as an engineer in sugar plantations on Negros Island near Bacolod. She attended the Brent School in Baguio for grammar school and high school then moved to New York City in the 1940s.

Stage
Wyllie acted with the Pasadena Playhouse, in Visit to a Small Planet (1958), Two on an Island (1940) and All the Comforts of Home (1941). She had previously appeared in Dear Brutus and Morning Glory there.

Wyllie was in the original production of The Glass Menagerie. On Broadway, she performed in Norman Ginsbury's historic play [[The First Gentleman (play)|The First Gentleman]].

Television
Wyllie "appeared on nearly every popular TV series of the late 1950s and much of the 1960s."

In 1960, Wyllie appeared as a grandmother in the "Bullets and Ballet" episode of Tightrope!, as Mrs. Blowers in Wagon Train in the episode "The Ricky & Laurie Bell Story" and in The Twilight Zone episode "The Night of the Meek". That same year, she was cast as Mrs. Shafer in the episode "The Captain's Dilemma" of the CBS military sitcom/drama series, Hennesey, starring Jackie Cooper as a United States Navy physician and Abby Dalton as nurse Martha Hale.

Between 1962 and 1966 Wyllie made four guest appearances on Perry Mason.  Her most substantial role of these was as Ninevah Stone in the episode, "The Case of the Nebulous Nephew" (1963).  She also played Marguerite Keith, the owner of a home in the path of a road, in the 1964 episode "The Case of the Ruinous Road".

In the 1963–1964 season, Wyllie had a recurring role as Mrs. Kissel in 18 episodes of ABC's family western series, The Travels of Jaimie McPheeters, starring child actor Kurt Russell in the title role. Mark Allen played Matt Kissel, her husband, in nineteen episodes. In nine episodes, four of The Osmonds were cast as the singing sons of the Kissel family, all with given names of books of the Old Testament, Micah, Deuteronomy, Lamentations, and Leviticus. She played the first-ever villain in Star Trek, the Talosian "Keeper" in the pilot episode, "The Cage" (1964). Not broadcast in its original form for many years, this material was used in the two-parter, "The Menagerie" (1966). She also appeared in Batman alongside Tallulah Bankhead in one episode “Black Widow Strikes Again” (1967)

Wyllie appeared on ABC's General Hospital as three different characters-Nurse Doris Roach (1974) who revealed to Lesley Faulkner that her daughter (Laura Vining) was still alive; Antique shop proprietor Hester Frumpkin (1982) who worked for Laura's kidnapper, David Gray; and a brief replacement for Anna Lee as Lila Quartermaine (1994). She also played several different characters on both The Golden Girls and Designing Women.

Death
Wyllie died on January 1, 2002, at the age of 84 in Glendale, California, from heart failure. She was survived by a cousin.

Filmography

References

External links 
 

 

1917 births
2002 deaths
American expatriates in the Philippines
American film actresses
American television actresses
Actresses from Hawaii
American Episcopalians
20th-century American actresses